The Color Clear is the third studio album by American metalcore band Reflections. The album was released on September 18, 2015, through eOne Music and Good Fight Entertainment. It was recorded and produced by Will Putney in Belleville, New Jersey.

A music video was released for the first single from the album "Actias Luna" on August 18, 2015. To promote the album, a tour was held during the winter months at the end of 2015 and beginning of 2016.

Content

Musical direction
The band's musical direction shifted greatly from their last album which led to a lot of mixed reviews and confusion amongst fans. Vocalist Jake Wolf explained "It’s a sound that was found while writing The Fantasy Effect and lost in the midst of writing and recording our album Exi(s)t."

Lyrics
In an interview with NewNoise Magazine, Wolf explained that "It wasn’t until the process of writing and making The Color Clear that I was able to find myself again." He also went on to state that many of the topics included on the album reflect his "years of physical, mental and emotional abuse, chemical dependency, more traumatizing events than I care to remember, and years of self harm."

Track listing

Personnel
Jake Wolf – lead vocals
Patrick Somoulay – guitars
Francis Xayana – bass
Nick Lona – drums

Additional personnel
Will Putney – production, mixing, mastering

Chart history
 Debuted at No. 6 on the Heatseekers Albums Chart.
 Debuted at No. 15 on the Independent Albums Chart
 Debuted at No. 96 on the Billboard 200 Chart

References

2015 albums
Reflections (Minnesota band) albums
MNRK Music Group albums
Albums produced by Will Putney